North by Northamptonshire is a BBC Radio 4 comedy, written by Katherine Jakeways, that takes place in Northamptonshire. The first series was transmitted in the summer of 2010, the second series in December 2011 and January 2012 and the third series in December 2013 and January 2014. Series 1 was produced by Claire Jones, series 2 by Victoria Lloyd and Series 3 by Steven Canny.

Cast list
Narrator: Sheila Hancock
Jan: Felicity Montagu
Helen: Jessica Henwick
Mary: Penelope Wilton
Norman: Geoffrey Palmer
Esther: Katherine Jakeways
Rod: Mackenzie Crook (series 1-2); Tim Key (series 3)
Jonathan: Kevin Eldon
Angela: Lizzie Roper
Frank: Rufus Wright
Keith: John Biggins
Arnold: Felix Dexter
Orson: Nathaniel Parker

Episode list

Press
The show was nominated for a Sony Radio Award in 2012. A Time Out review said that "the laughs are cruel, but the monsters of suburbia are curiously sympathetic". The Stage praised Jakeways as a "major comedy writing talent".

References

BBC Radio comedy programmes